A penumbral lunar eclipse took place on May 26, 2002, the first of three lunar eclipses in 2002.

Visibility 

The beginning of the penumbral phase was visible in most of North America except the northeast, Central America, western South America, extreme northeast Russia, eastern Asia, Australia, most of Antarctica, the Pacific Ocean, and the southeast Indian Ocean; the end of the eclipse was visible in southwestern Alaska, Asia except the extreme north, Australia, the eastern Indian Ocean, and most of the Pacific Ocean except the extreme eastern part.

Relation to other lunar eclipses

Eclipses of 2002 
 A penumbral lunar eclipse on May 26.
 An annular solar eclipse on June 10.
 A penumbral lunar eclipse on June 24.
 A penumbral lunar eclipse on November 20.
 A total solar eclipse on December 4.

It is the first of four lunar year cycles, repeating every 354 days.

Eclipse season 

This is the first eclipse this season.

Second eclipse this season: 10 June 2002 Annular Solar Eclipse

Third eclipse this season: 24 June 2002 Penumbral Lunar Eclipse

Saros series 

Lunar Saros 111, repeating every 18 years and 11 days, has a total of 71 lunar eclipse events including 11 total lunar eclipses. The first total lunar eclipse of this series was on April 19, 1353, and last was on August 4, 1533. The longest occurrence of this series was on June 12, 1443 when the totality lasted 106 minutes.

Metonic series
First eclipse: May 26, 2002.
Second eclipse: May 26, 2021.
Third eclipse: May 26, 2040.
Fourth eclipse: May 27, 2059.

Half-Saros cycle
A lunar eclipse will be preceded and followed by solar eclipses by 9 years and 5.5 days (a half saros). This lunar eclipse is related to two partial solar eclipses of Solar Saros 118.

In popular culture
This eclipse appears in the 2022 film Turning Red, although it differs from actual events. It is depicted as taking place on the evening of May 25, rather than the early morning hours of May 26. Additionally, the film takes place in Toronto, where the total eclipse was not visible.

See also 
List of lunar eclipses
List of 21st-century lunar eclipses

References

External links 
 Saros cycle 111
 
 http://www.eclipse.org.uk/eclipse/1132002/

2002-05
2002 in science